Zevenhuizen is a hamlet in the Dutch province of South Holland. It is a partly in the municipality of Kaag en Braassem and partly in the municipality of Teylingen. Zevenhuizen lies about 7 km northeast of Leiden.

Zevenhuizen is not a statistical entity, and is considered part of Oud Ade and Warmond. It consists of about 40 houses and 70 houseboats.

References

Populated places in South Holland
Kaag en Braassem